Gilberto Moraes Júnior (born 7 March 1993), simply known as Gilberto, is a Brazilian professional footballer who plays as a right back for Portuguese club Benfica.

Club career

Botafogo
Born in Campinas, São Paulo, Gilberto joined Botafogo's youth setup in 2010, from CFZ do Rio. He made his first team debut on 23 April 2011, starting in a 2–5 Campeonato Carioca loss against Boavista, as the club opted to use the under-20 squad.

Gilberto made his Série A debut on 5 September 2012, coming on as a late substitute for Márcio Azevedo in a 3–1 away win against Cruzeiro. Definitely promoted to the main squad in 2013, he spent the campaign as a third-choice behind Lucas and Edílson.

On 5 January 2014, Gilberto was loaned to fellow top tier side Internacional, for one year. He scored his first senior goal on his debut for the club on 2 February, netting his team's third in a 4–1 Campeonato Gaúcho home routing over Cruzeiro-RS.

A first-choice in the 2014 Campeonato Gaúcho, Gilberto shared the same amount of playing time with Wellington Silva and Cláudio Winck in the Série A before returning to his parent club Botafogo for the 2015 campaign.

With Fogão now in the Série B, Gilberto became an undisputed starter, and scored his first goal for the club on 11 March 2015 in a 3–0 home win against Tigres do Brasil.

Fiorentina
On 22 July 2015, Gilberto moved abroad after signing a contract with Italian Serie A side Fiorentina, for a rumoured fee of R$ 3.4 million. He made his debut abroad on 23 August, starting in a 2–0 home win against Milan.

On 1 February 2016, after featuring rarely, Gilberto was loaned to fellow Serie A side Hellas Verona until the end of the season. He moved to Serie B side Latina also in a temporary deal on 31 August, before returning to his home country with Vasco da Gama, also on loan, on 31 January 2017.

Fluminense
On 29 December 2017, Gilberto agreed to a one-year loan deal with Fluminense. His loan was renewed for a further year on 2 January 2019, and he became an undisputed starter for the club in that year.

On 26 December 2019, Fiorentina announced that 50% of Gilberto's economic rights were sold to Fluminense. He signed a contract until July 2022 with the club.

Benfica
On 8 August 2020, Gilberto agreed to a five-year deal with Portuguese Primeira Liga side S.L. Benfica. He was a regular starter in the most of the campaign, but lost his starting spot to Diogo Gonçalves in May, and was subsequently deemed surplus to requirements by manager Jorge Jesus.

International career
Gilberto was called up to the Brazil under-21 team for the 2014 Toulon Tournament. In the following year, he was also a part of the under-23 side which played in the Pan American Games; he featured in four matches during the competition.

Career statistics

Honours
Internacional
Campeonato Gaúcho: 2014

Fluminense
Taça Rio: 2020

Brazil U20
Toulon Tournament: 2014

References

External links

Profile at the S.L. Benfica website

1993 births
Living people
Sportspeople from Campinas
Association football fullbacks
Brazilian footballers
Brazil youth international footballers
Brazilian expatriate footballers
Campeonato Brasileiro Série A players
Serie A players
Serie B players
Primeira Liga players
Botafogo de Futebol e Regatas players
Sport Club Internacional players
ACF Fiorentina players
Hellas Verona F.C. players
Latina Calcio 1932 players
CR Vasco da Gama players
Fluminense FC players
S.L. Benfica footballers
Footballers at the 2015 Pan American Games
Brazilian expatriate sportspeople in Italy
Brazilian expatriate sportspeople in Portugal
Expatriate footballers in Italy
Expatriate footballers in Portugal
Pan American Games bronze medalists for Brazil
Pan American Games medalists in football
Medalists at the 2015 Pan American Games